Howe Peter Browne, 2nd Marquess of Sligo  (18 May 1788, London – 26 January 1845, Tunbridge Wells), was an Irish peer and colonial governor, styled Viscount Westport until 1800 and Earl of Altamont from 1800 to 1809.

Early life
Howe Browne was the son and heir of John Browne, 1st Marquess of Sligo. He was educated at Eton and Jesus College, Cambridge, receiving his MA as Lord Altamont in 1808. During his early years he is reputed to have befriended Thomas De Quincey and Lord Byron. He became Marquess of Sligo in 1809 on the death of his father and was appointed a Knight of the Order of St Patrick on 11 November 1809.

In 1812 Browne was charged with "enticing and persuading (a seaman) to desert (the navy)", a charge punishable with the death sentence at its most extreme. Browne was found guilty and sentenced to a £5,000 fine and four months in Newgate prison. In an odd turn of events, during the course of the trial, his mother grew amorous for the Judge Sir William Scott. Following the trial, the two were introduced and later married, despite a 20-year age gap. However, the marriage did not prove to be a happy one and was apparently on the rocks after just one year.

Previous to his marriage, he had a relationship with the French courtesan Pauline 'Cherie' Pacquot. The affair produced one son, whose paternity Howe questioned upon discovering he was not Pauline's only lover. Following his split from Pauline, On 4 March 1816, Browne married the 16-year-old Hester Catherine, daughter of John de Burgh, 13th Earl of Clanricarde. His mother is said to have remarked that "the most remarkable likeness to Pauline that I ever saw". The couple had 14 children between 1817 and 1839. Lady Hester was a cultured woman who patronised the arts and renovated Westport House, the family seat in County Mayo, and its gardens. The family also had a London home at 16 Mansfield Street, Marylebone. With her husband, she campaigned to abolish slavery, and later to relieve the Irish famine. She was a patron of the Sisters of Mercy.

Governor of Jamaica

In 1834-35 he was appointed Governor and Vice-Admiral of Jamaica and received with much pomp and circumstance. The local plantation owners assumed that Browne, as a plantation owner himself, would look after their interests. However Browne's ownership of two plantations on the island had come to him via an inheritance upon the death of his grandmother, and as Browne would reveal in short order, did not think much of the institution of slavery being practised on the island.

Arriving shortly after the Slavery Abolition Act of 1833, Browne attempted to oversee the transition from slavery into a free society. He reformed the legal system, appointing the mixed-race Richard Hill in charge of the stipendiary magistrates during "the Apprenticeship" (a four-year period in which the black population was to be "taught" how to be "proper citizens"). He also set up schools for the black population, two of which he personally financed.

These moves almost instantly made Browne a villain to the ruling class in Jamaica. They quickly mocked his past reputation in the local press; "We are fully aware of his Lordship's nautical excursions and frolics before he came to Jamaica". By 1836 the Jamaican Assembly were blocking his attempts to fully emancipate the Black Jamaican population and were able to force him to resign from the Governorship. The first free village of Sligoville in Saint Catherine parish, Jamaica is named after him.

Lord and Lady Sligo are buried in Kensal Green Cemetery. Their grave lies in the centre of the overgrown northwest quadrant of the inner circle.

References

External links

 Lord Sligo in Greece and Jamaica at Turtle Bunbury

1788 births
1845 deaths
Alumni of Jesus College, Cambridge
19th-century Anglo-Irish people
Howe
Burials at Kensal Green Cemetery
Governors of Jamaica
Irish abolitionists
Knights of St Patrick
Lord-Lieutenants of Mayo
Howe
Members of the Privy Council of Ireland
Members of the Privy Council of the United Kingdom
Politicians from County Mayo
Irish slave owners
People educated at Eton College